Lennart Samuelson is an economic historian who works for the Stockholm Institute of Transition Economics. His research focuses on the Soviet Union's economic history.

Works

References

Living people
Stockholm School of Economics
Economic historians
Economic history of the Soviet Union
Year of birth missing (living people)